Soavinandriana is a district of Itasy in Madagascar.

Communes
The district is further divided into 15 communes:

 Ambatoasana Centre
 Amberomanga
 Ambohidanerana
 Amparaky
 Ampary
 Ampefy
 Ankaranana
 Ankisabe
 Antanetibe
 Dondona
 Mahavelona
 Mananasy
 Masindray
 Soavinandriana
 Tamponala

References 

Districts of Itasy Region